Warren Richards (born 4 July 1950) is an Australian judoka. He competed in the men's lightweight event at the 1976 Summer Olympics. He attended Newington College from 1960 until 1966.

In January 2000, as a former Olympian, Richards applied to be a torchbearer in the 2000 Summer Olympics torch relay.  His invitation was withdrawn when the organising committee learned that he was imprisoned at Long Bay Jail on a drug trafficking conviction.

References

External links
 

1950 births
Living people
People educated at Newington College
Australian male judoka
Olympic judoka of Australia
Judoka at the 1976 Summer Olympics
Place of birth missing (living people)